Jean-Florent de Vallière (7 September 1667 – 7 January 1759) was a French artillery officer of the 18th century. He was lieutenant-general of the King's Armies. In 1726, de Vallière became Director-General of the Battalions and Schools of the Artillery.

Vallière was a member of the Académie de Marine. After his death, his seat went to Chabert-Cogolin.

Through the Royal Ordonnance of 7 October 1732, Vallière endeavoured to reorganize and standardize the King's artillery. He significantly improved the method used for founding cannons, superseding the technique developed by Jean-Jacques Keller. He thus developed the de Vallière system, which set the standard for French artillery until the advent of the Gribeauval system.

De Vallière system
Whereas numerous formats and designs had been in place in the French army, de Vallière standardized the French sizes in artillery pieces, by allowing only for the production of 24 (Canon de 24), 12, 8 and 4 pound guns (the weight is the weight of the cannonballs), mortars of 12 and 8 French inches, and stone-throwing mortars of 15 French inches.

The French pound weighing 1.097 English pounds, the French guns fired slightly heavier balls (13.164 pounds) than their English equivalent 12-pounder. The French inch was 2.707 cm, slightly longer than the English inch of 2.54 cm.

The de Vallière system used core drilling of the bore of cannons founded in one piece of bronze, a method developed at that time by Jean Maritz, which allowed for much higher precision of the bore shape and surface, and therefore higher shooting efficiency.

The de Valliere guns were also highly decorative and contained numerous designs and inscriptions.

Barrel

The back part occasionally included an inscription showing the weight of the cannonball (for example a "4" for a 4-pounder), followed by the Latin inscription "Nec pluribus impar," a motto of King Louis XIV and translated literally as "not unequal to many," but ascribed various meanings including "alone against all," "none his equal," or "capable of anything" among many others. This was followed by the royal crest of the Bourbon dynasty. The location and date of manufacture were inscribed (in the example "Strasbourg, 1745") at the bottom of the gun, and finally the name and title of the founder (in the example "Fondu par Jean Maritz, Commissaire des Fontes").  The breech was decorated with an animal face showing the rating of the gun (in the example the lion head for a 24-pounder).

Breech design
The guns had cascabel designs which allowed to easily recognize their rating: a 4-pounder would have a "Face in a sunburst", an 8-pounder a "Monkey head", a 12-pounder a "Rooster head", a 16-pounder a "Medusa head", and a 24-pounder a "Bacchus head" or a "Lion head".

Operational activity
The de Valliere guns proved rather good in siege warfare, but were less satisfactory in a war of movement. This was especially visible during the War of the Austrian Succession (1747–1748), and during the Seven Years' War (1756–1763) where mobility was a key factor and lighter guns were clearly in need. The lack of howitzers was another issue.

Numerous de Valliere guns were used in the American War of Independence, especially the smaller field guns. The guns were shipped from France, and the field carriages provided for in the US. These guns played an important role in such battles as the Battle of Saratoga, and the Siege of Yorktown. George Washington wrote about the guns in a letter to General Heath on 2 May 1777:

Obsolescence
Jean-Florent de Vallière’s son, Joseph Florent de Vallière (1717–1776), who became Commander of the Battalions and Schools of the Artillery in 1747, persisted in implementing his father's system. From 1763, Gribeauval, as Inspector General of the French Artillery, and second in rank to de Vallière, started efforts to introduce the more modern system that would give France one of the strongest artilleries for the following century.

Notes

References
 Chartrand, René 2003 Napoleon's guns 1792-1815 (2)  Osprey Publishing
 

Valliere system
1667 births
1759 deaths
French generals
Members of the French Academy of Sciences